Gelechia paroxynta is a moth of the family Gelechiidae. It is found in Tibet.

References

Moths described in 1931
Gelechia